Niclas Andersén (born 5 August 1992) is a Swedish footballer who plays for GAIS as a left-back.

References

External links
 
 
 
 

1992 births
Living people
Association football defenders
Sweden youth international footballers
Swedish footballers
Allsvenskan players
Superettan players
IFK Göteborg players
Ljungskile SK players
BK Häcken players
GAIS players